Lemogang Maswena (born 5 February 1991) is a Botswanan football midfielder who currently plays for Jwaneng Galaxy.

References

1991 births
Living people
Botswana footballers
Botswana international footballers
Notwane F.C. players
Township Rollers F.C. players
Orapa United F.C. players
Jwaneng Galaxy F.C. players
Association football midfielders